This can refer to:
 Wichard Joachim Heinrich von Möllendorf
 Wichard von Moellendorff (engineer)